This is a summary of 1923 in music in the United Kingdom.

Events
12 June – William Walton's Façade, a collaboration with Edith Sitwell, is given its first public performance at the Aeolian Hall, London. The critics' reception is unfavourable.
4 July – Ralph Vaughan Williams's English Folk Song Suite is premièred at Kneller Hall, conducted by Hector Adkins. 
September–October – Philip Heseltine (Peter Warlock) and E. J. Moeran tour East Anglia in search of original folk music.
11 November – The première of John Foulds's A World Requiem is held at the Royal Albert Hall in London, with soloists including Herbert Heyner. It is repeated on that date each year until 1926.
23 December – The Beggar's Opera by John Gay and Dr Pepusch, with score restored by Frederic Austin, ends its record run  of 1,463 performances at the Lyric Theatre, Hammersmith; Austin himself plays Peachum, with Frederick Ranalow as Macheath and Sylvia Nelis as Polly. 
date unknown
The Royal Scottish Country Dance Society is founded by Jean Milligan and Ysobel Stewart.
The moving-coil microphone is developed by Captain H. J. Round and is adopted by the BBC's London studios. 
Edward Elgar moves to the village of Kempsey, Worcestershire, where he will live until 1927.
Arthur Bliss's father retires to California. Arthur goes with him to work as a conductor, lecturer, pianist and occasional critic.
Eugene Aynsley Goossens becomes conductor of the Rochester Philharmonic Orchestra in the United States.
Henry Tippett agrees to support his son Michael Tippett's studies at the Royal College of Music, where Michael is accepted despite lacking the entry qualifications.
The Savoy Orpheans is formed as a resident dance band at the Savoy Hotel, London, by Debroy Somers.

Classical music: new works
Kenneth J. Alford – Cavalry of the Clouds
Granville Bantock – Suite from Cathay (words by Ezra Pound)
Arthur Bliss – String Quartet
Gerald Finzi – A Severn Rhapsody
Constant Lambert – 2 Songs (words by Sacheverell Sitwell), for soprano, flute and harp 
Roger Quilter – "The Fuschia Tree", Op. 25 No. 2 
Cyril Scott – The Incompetent Apothecary (ballet)
Ralph Vaughan Williams – Sea Songs
William Walton – Toccata for Violin and Piano

Opera
Gustav Holst – The Perfect Fool

Musical theatre
 London Calling!, a revue produced by André Charlot with music and lyrics by Noël Coward, co-starring Coward and Gertrude Lawrence, opens at the Duke of York's Theatre on 4 September and runs for 367 performances.

Births
21 April – Ronald Cass, film composer (died 2006)
15 May – John Lanchbery, composer and conductor (died 2003)
4 August – Arthur Butterworth, composer (died 2014)
19 August – Dill Jones, pianist (died 1984)
30 September – Donald Swann, musician (died 1994)
5 October – Glynis Johns, actress and singer
10 November – Anne Shelton, singer (died 1994)

Deaths
18 January – Kate Santley, German-born actress, singer and comedian (exact age unknown)
10 July – Albert Chevalier, actor, singer, songwriter and music hall performer, 62 
27 August – Letty Lind, singer and burlesque performer, 61
12 October – John Cadvan Davies, poet and hymn-writer, 77
date unknown – Nicholas Kilburn, choral conductor and composer, 80

See also
 1923 in the United Kingdom

References

British Music, 1923 in
Music
British music by year
1920s in British music